Matt Case (born February 16, 1986) is an American former professional ice hockey defenseman. He played in the North American minor-leagues and with Lillehammer IK of the GET-ligaen of Norway.

Playing career
Case attended Ferris State University where he played college hockey with the Ferris State Bulldogs men's ice hockey team before turning professional with the Norfolk Admirals near the end of the 2009–10 AHL season.

On May 21, 2013, after three professional seasons in North America, Case signed a contract with European club, Lillehammer IK of the Norwegian GET-ligaen.

After a single season with Lillehammer, Case returned to the Idaho Steelheads on a one-year contract on August 1, 2014.

On May 22, 2015, Case signed for a second stint in Norway in agreeing to a one-year contract with the Sparta Warriors of the GET. Before making his debut with the Warriors, he opted to retire from professional hockey.

Awards and honors

References

External links

1986 births
Living people
American men's ice hockey defensemen
Ferris State Bulldogs men's ice hockey players
Green Bay Gamblers players
Gwinnett Gladiators players
Idaho Steelheads (ECHL) players
Lillehammer IK players
Manchester Monarchs (AHL) players
Norfolk Admirals players
Texas Stars players